Yuryevka is a village in the Ysyk-Ata District of Chüy Region of Kyrgyzstan located on the right bank of Ysyk-Ata. The village was established in 1909. Its population was 4,205 in 2021.

References

Populated places in Chüy Region